The Constitution of India establishes the structure of the Indian government, including the relationship between the federal government and state governments. Part XI of the Indian constitution specifies the distribution of legislative, administrative and executive powers between the union government and the States of India. The legislative powers are categorised under a Union List, a State List and a Concurrent List, representing, respectively, the powers conferred upon the Union government, those conferred upon the State governments and powers shared among them.

This federalism is symmetrical in that the devolved powers of the constituent units are envisioned to be the same. Historically, the state of Jammu and Kashmir was accorded a status different from other States owing to an explicitly temporary provision of the Indian Constitution namely Article 370 (which was revoked by the Parliament in 2019). Union territories are unitary type, directly governed by the Union government. Article 1 (1) of the constitution stipulates two tier-governance with an additional local elected government. Delhi and Puducherry were accorded legislatures under Article 239AA and 239A, respectively.

Features 
There are two or more levels (tiers) of government.

Each level of government has its own jurisdiction in matters of legislation, taxation, and administration even though they govern the same citizens.

Powers and functions of each tier of government are specified and guaranteed by the Constitution.

The Supreme Court has been given the power to settle disputes between state governments.

Legislative powers 
The division of powers are defined by the constitution and the legislative powers are divided into three lists:

Union List 

Union List consists of 100 items (earlier 97) on which the parliament has exclusive power to legislate. This includes: defense, armed forces, arms and ammunition, atomic energy, foreign affairs, war and peace, citizenship, extradition, railways, shipping and navigation, airways, posts and telegraphs, telephones, wireless and broadcasting, currency, foreign trade, inter-state trade and commerce, banking, insurance, control of industries, regulation and development of mines, mineral and oil resources, elections, audit of Government accounts, constitution and organisation of the Supreme Court, High courts and union public service commission, income tax, customs and export duties, duties of excise, corporation tax, taxes on the capital value of assets, estate duty and terminal taxes.

State List 

State List consists of 61 items (earlier 66 items). Uniformity is desirable but not essential on items in this list: maintaining law and order, police forces, healthcare, transport, land policies, electricity in the state, village administration, etc. The state legislature has exclusive power to make laws on these subjects. In certain circumstances, the parliament can make laws on subjects mentioned in the State List, but to do so the Rajya Sabha (Council of States) must pass a resolution with a two-thirds majority that it is expedient to legislate in the national interest.

Though states have exclusive powers to legislate with regards to items on the State List, articles 249, 250, 252, and 253 mention situations in which the Union government can legislate.

Concurrent List 

Concurrent List consists of 52 (earlier 47) items. Uniformity is desirable but not essential on items in this list. The list mentions: marriage and divorce, transfer of property other than agricultural land, education, contracts, bankruptcy and insolvency, trustees and trusts, civil procedure, contempt of court, adulteration of foodstuffs, drugs and poisons, economic and social planning, trade unions, labour welfare, electricity, newspapers, books and printing press NS stamp duties.

Other (residuary subjects) 
Subjects not mentioned in any of the three lists are known as residuary subjects. However, many provisions in the constitution outside these lists permit parliament or state Legislative assembly to legislate. Excluding the provisions of the constitution outside these lists per Article 245, the power to legislate on such subjects, rests with the parliament exclusively per Article 248. Parliament shall legislate on residuary subjects following the Article 368 procedure as constitutional amendments.

In case the above lists are to be expanded or amended, the legislation should be done by the Parliament under its constituent power per Article 368 with ratification by the majority of the states. Federalism is part of the basic structure of the Indian constitution which cannot be altered or destroyed through constitutional amendments under the constituent powers of the Parliament without undergoing judicial review by the Supreme Court.

Executive powers 
The Union and States have independent executive staffs controlled by their respective governments. In legislative and administrative matters, the union government cannot overrule the constitutional rights/powers of a state government except when presidential rule is declared in a State. The Union's duty is to ensure that the government of every State is carried on in accordance with the provisions of the Constitution as per Article 355 and Article 256. The State governments cannot violate the Central laws in administrative matters. When a State violates the Constitution, Presidential rule can be imposed under Article 356 and the President takes over the State’s administration with ex post facto consent of the Parliament per Article 357.

Financial powers 
Article 282 accords financial autonomy in spending financial resources available to the states for public purpose. Article 293 allows States to borrow without limit without consent from the Union government. However, the Union government can insist upon compliance with its loan terms when a state has outstanding loans charged to the consolidated fund of India or a federally-guaranteed loan.

The President of India constitutes a Finance Commission every five years to recommend devolution of Union revenues to State governments.

Under Article 360, the President can proclaim a financial emergency when the financial stability or credit of the nation or of any part of its territory is threatened. However, no guidelines define "financial emergency" for the country or a state or union territory or a panchayat or a municipality or a corporation.

An emergency like this must be approved by the Parliament within two months by a simple majority and has never been declared. A state of financial emergency remains in force indefinitely until revoked by the President. The President can reduce the salaries of all government officials, including judges of the supreme court and high courts, in cases of a financial emergency. All money bills passed by the state legislatures are submitted to the President for approval. He can direct the state to observe economy measures.

Disputes Resolution 
States can make agreements among themselves. When a dispute arises with other states or union territory or the union government, the Supreme Court adjudicates per Article 131. However, Article 262 excludes Supreme Court jurisdiction with respect to the adjudication of disputes in the use, distribution or control of interstate river waters.

Under Article 263 the President can establish an interstate council to coordinate/resolve disputes between states and the Union. States have their own jurisdiction.

The recent experience of the successful implementation of indirect tax reforms in India shows that a dominant ruling party can adopt a concessionary approacroach to resolve disputes amicably, rather than attempting to over-awe the states or impose its will on the units. This has been called concessionary federalism.

Academic research and theories  
According to Kumarasingham, there are three distinctive features of India's federalism. First, its origins in Partition and the Princely States. Second, its constitutional power over the borders. Third, its early compromise of different cultural elements in the first decade.

Union territories 
Article 1 (1) says that India is a Union of States as elaborated under Parts V (The Union) and VI (The States) of the Constitution. Article 1 (3) says territories of India constitute states, union territories and other acquired territories. The concept of union territory was established by the Seventh Amendment.

Aberrations 
The state of Jammu and Kashmir had (until it was abolished by Union Government on 5 August 2019) a separate set of applicable laws under Article 370 a temporary article of the Constitution of India , read with Application to Jammu and Kashmir Order, 1954 (Appendix I and II). Only matters related to defense, foreign relations, and communications of Jammu and Kashmir were under the jurisdiction of Union government. Laws enacted by the Parliament of India (including amendments to the constitution) applicable to rest of India were not valid in Jammu and Kashmir unless ratified by its state assembly. The Government of India could declare a state of emergency in Jammu and Kashmir and impose Governor's rule in certain conditions. The state had its own constitution other than applicable Indian constitution. Part XII of the Jammu and Kashmir state constitution made provision to amend its constitution with a two-thirds majority by the state assembly. Part VI (The states) and Part XIV (Services) of the Indian constitution were not applicable to Jammu and Kashmir per Article 152 and Article 308.

On 5 August 2019, the Government of India, by the powers vested in it by Constitution of India, passed a motion to dissolve Article 370 of the Constitution of India for the state of Jammu and Kashmir, and bifurcated the state into two Union Territories – Jammu and Kashmir, and Ladakh by introducing the Jammu and Kashmir Reorganization Act in the Parliament of India.

Unitary Features 
Article 1 (1) of the constitution says India shall be a union of states. The amended (in 1956) Article 3, allows the union government power with the prior consent of the President (common head of states and union governments) to (a) form a new state/UT by separating a territory of any state, or by uniting two or more states/UTs or parts of states/UTs, or by uniting any territory to a part of any state/UT; (b) the power to establish new states/UT (which were not previously under India's territory) which were not in existence before.

Appointment and role of governors 
Appointment of governors is the responsibility of the Central government through the President. Governors are generally not residents of the state.

Should the constitutional machinery in a state break down, Article 356 allows a state of emergency that dissolves the state government and establishes Presidential rule. No emergency at the centre can dissolve the Union government. Misuse of Article 356 was rampant in the decades following its adoption, during the Indira Gandhi era. In 1991 the Supreme court passed a landmark judgement acknowledging misuse of the article and establishing principles for the Union government to follow before a state emergency can be invoked.

The Lieutenant Governors of Union Territories of India are designed as administrators and are appointed by the President on the advice of the Union government. Lieutenant Governors can override local government policies only after taking parliament consent.

Economic federalism 
States are at liberty to manage their finances as long as that does not lead to financial emergency as per Article 360. The Government of India is trying to impose uniform taxation throughout India and to take over states' tax collection mechanisms without regard to the impacts on individual states. Recently the Supreme Court upheld the constitutional right of states to impose an Entry Tax which is against the principle of a general sales tax (GST). However, the coordination dilemma, which had plagued the indirect tax reform process since 1991, has been resolved by deploying a mechanism called 'concessionary federalism' characterized by making reciprocal concessions and compromises as midpoints of competing claims.

Control of industries, which was a subject in the concurrent list in the 1935 act, was transferred to the Union List. The Union government in 1952 introduced the freight equalization policy that damaged many Indian states, including West Bengal, Bihar (including present-day Jharkhand), Madhya Pradesh (including present-day Chhattisgarh), and Orissa. These states lost their competitive advantage of holding mineral resources, as factories could now operate anywhere in India. This was not the case in the pre-independence era when business houses such as the Tatas and the Dalmias set up industries in these states, and most of the engineering industry was located in West Bengal. Following the end of the policy in the early 1990s, these states did not catch up with more industrialized states. In 1996, the Commerce & Industry Minister of West Bengal complained that "the removal of the freight equalisation and licensing policies cannot compensate for the ill that has already been done".

National laws permit a private/public limited company to raise loans internally and externally to its capacity. The Fiscal Responsibility and Budget Management Act, 2003 limits state borrowing even when they have not defaulted/faced a financial emergency. The employees' salary and pension expenditure of many state governments exceed their total revenue, without the President declaring a financial emergency. Article 47 of Directive Principles of the state policy prohibits intoxicating drinks that are injurious to health but is not enforced. Instead many states promote and tax liquor sales.

Political economy  
The government is devolving central funds to the states under specific schemes (NREGA, etc.) whose implementation by the states is controversially subject to government approval, which violates Article 282. The controversy arises from the fact that the grants for centrally sponsored schemes and central plan schemes are under the ruling party's control and discretion. The empirical research shows that a general tendency is to direct grants to states which are politically important rather than to those states which are in need or where poor people are concentrated. This has been described as an instance of pork-barrel politics in India. In order to achieve partisan goals, the union government designs the nomenclature of the welfare schemes in a way that projects the prime minister's party as the source of these welfare schemes.

Government of India Act (1935) vs Constitution of India (1950)

Comparison with the USA and the EU

See also

 Lawmaking procedure in India
 President's rule
 President of India
 Prime Minister of India
 Governors of the states of India
 Chief ministers of the states of India
 Part I of the Constitution of India
 List of amendments of the Constitution of India
 List of Acts of the Parliament of India

References

 
India